Deltophalonia huanuci is a species of moth of the family Tortricidae. It is found in Peru.

The wingspan is 19–22 mm. The ground colour of the forewings is cream grey, suffused with brownish grey. The markings are blackish. The hindwings are creamish grey with confluent brown-grey strigulation (fine streaks).

Etymology
The species name refers to the type locality in the Huánuco Region.

References

Moths described in 2010
Cochylini